Rhondda West was a parliamentary constituency centred on the Rhondda district of Wales.  It returned one Member of Parliament (MP)  to the House of Commons of the Parliament of the United Kingdom, elected by the first past the post system. Along with Rhondda East it was formed by dividing the old Rhondda constituency.

History

The constituency was created for the 1918 general election, and abolished for the February 1974 general election.

Boundaries 
Throughout its existence the constituency included the towns of Treorchy and Tonypandy.

1918–1974: The Urban District of Rhondda first, second, third, fourth, and fifth wards, and part of the sixth.

Members of Parliament

Election results

Elections in the 1910s 
General Election 1918, Rhondda
William Abraham returned unopposed

Elections in the 1920s 

General Election 1924, Rhondda West
William John returned unopposed

Elections in the 1930s

Elections in the 1940s

Elections in the 1950s

Elections in the 1960s

Elections in the 1970s

See also 
 1920 Rhondda West by-election
 1967 Rhondda West by-election

References 
 
 

Politics of Glamorgan
Historic parliamentary constituencies in South Wales
Constituencies of the Parliament of the United Kingdom established in 1918
Constituencies of the Parliament of the United Kingdom disestablished in 1974